The Louth Under-21 Football Championship is an annual competition organised by Louth GAA for Gaelic football teams in County Louth.

History
First contested in 1972, the inaugural winners were Cooley Kickhams. As is the case nationally, amalgamated parish teams are a regular feature of the competition due to lack of numbers. The county board removed the competition from the calendar in the mid-1980s but it returned in 1991. 
The competition has on occasion been run as an under-20 tournament, in line with changes introduced by the GAA in 2018. It has since reverted to the U-21 format.

The captain of the winning side is presented with the McGeough Cup.

Finals

 Mellifont Rovers - Mattock Rangers/Hunterstown/Glen Emmets combination

 St Fursey's - Geraldines and St Bride's combination

 Naomh Buithe - combination team from Monasterboice, Collon, Tullyallen parishes

See also

References

External links
 Louth GAA official website
 Louth on Hoganstand

Louth GAA club championships
Gaelic football County Championships
Gaelic football in County Louth